Elizabeth Granowska or Elisabeth Pilecki (– 12 May 1420 in Kraków) was Queen consort of Poland (1417–1420) as the third wife of Władysław II Jagiełło (Jogaila), Grand Duke of Lithuania and King of Poland (reigning from 1386 to 1434).

Early life and first marriages
Elizabeth's uncle Spytek of Melsztyn was an influential figure in Jagiełło's court. When her father died in 1384 or 1385, Elizabeth inherited his vast estates, which included Pilica and Łańcut.

Her dramatic early life was described by Jan Długosz, but authenticity of that account is doubtful as it is not corroborated by other sources and Długosz did not provide dates. It is possible that the account was invented to discredit the unpopular queen. According to Długosz, Elizabeth was kidnapped by Wiseł Czambor from Moravia. Possibly Czambor wanted to marry Elizabeth to obtain her riches. She was kidnapped again by Jan (Jańczyk) of Jičina from Czambor's house. Czambor then traveled to Kraków where he was murdered by Jan, who later received a permission from Jogaila to marry Elizabeth. It is unclear if she married Czambor or Jan, but even if she did, she was soon widowed.

Around 1397, Elizabeth married , castellan of Nakło and a widower with at least three sons. The marriage provided a carrier boost to Granowski. He was sent on diplomatic missions to the Teutonic Knights and Wenceslaus IV of Bohemia. In 1409, he became starosta of Greater Poland and in 1410 commanded his own squad in the Battle of Grunwald. He died suddenly at the end of 1410. It is believed that he was poisoned. It is believed that Elizabeth and Granowski had two sons and three daughters.

Queen of Poland
In March 1416, Queen Anna of Celje died leaving King Jogaila a widower with one surviving daughter. Polish nobility encouraged Jogaila to remarry both for political reasons and to secure a male heir. Grand Duke of Lithuania Vytautas proposed a marriage to his granddaughter Maria Vasilievna, daughter of Vasily I of Moscow. Sigismund, Holy Roman Emperor, proposed his niece Elisabeth, Duchess of Luxembourg. Therefore, it came as a surprise when Jogaila decided to marry Elizabeth Granowska, a middle-aged widow with few political connections and scandalous past. Bishop  called her a "pig", while others dismayed over her age.

In January 1417, Jogaila traveled to Lithuania and stopped in Liuboml to meet with his sister Alexandra, who was accompanied by Elizabeth Granowska. After a few days, Jogaila left Liuboml but not before showering Elizabeth with many expensive gifts. It was not the first time they met as Elizabeth's family frequented Jogaila's court. In March 1417, on his way back to Poland, Jogaila stopped in Łańcut, Elizabeth's domain. It appears that the marriage decision, perhaps engineered by Alexandra, was made there. They married on 2 May 1417 in Sanok, but her coronation was postponed until 19 November due to resistance from the Polish nobility. They argued that the real queen was Princess Hedwig Jagiellon or that Elizabeth was a "spiritual sister" of Jogaila as her mother was his godmother. Jogaila obtained a dispensation from the Council of Constance.

Despite political disapproval, it appears that the marriage was happy. Elizabeth often accompanied her husband on various trips, but had little political sway. She fell ill, possibly with tuberculosis, in early 1419 and had trouble keeping up with her husband's travels. She died in May 1420 and was buried in the Wawel Cathedral. However, her body was later moved to make way for Stephen Báthory and the subsequent burial place is not known.

Issue
It is believed that Elizabeth had five children with Wincenty Granowski:
 Jadwiga, wife Jan of Leksandrowic
 Otton
 Elizabeth, wife of Bolko V, Duke of Opole
 , castellan of Kraków, progenitor of the family
 Ofka, wife of Jan of Jičina, son of Jan (Jańczyk) of Jičina

References
Notes

Bibliography
 

1370s births
1420 deaths
Polish queens consort
Burials at Wawel Cathedral
13th-century Polish people
13th-century Polish women
14th-century Polish people
14th-century Polish women